The San Fernando Pastoral Region is a pastoral region of the Archdiocese of Los Angeles in the Roman Catholic Church. It covers the San Fernando, Santa Clarita, and Antelope Valleys. The current regional auxiliary bishop is Bishop Alejandro D. Aclan. The Region has 54 parishes, 12 high schools, 2 hospitals, and 1 Spanish Mission.

Parishes

Deanery 5 (West San Fernando Valley)

Deanery 6 (Crescenta Valley, Glendale and Northeast Los Angeles)

Deanery 7 (Central/Eastern San Fernando Valley and Burbank)

Deanery 8 (Santa Clarita Valley, Lancaster and Palmdale)

Spanish Missions

Monasteries or Convents

Universities or Colleges
There are no Catholic universities or colleges in this Pastoral Region.

High schools

Elementary schools
Parish-affiliated elementary schools are noted above in the charts listing parishes.  In addition to parish-affiliated elementary schools, there is one non-affiliated middle school in the San Fernando Pastoral Region.
Chaminade Middle School, Chatsworth (Grades 6-8)

Hospitals

Cemeteries

See also
Roman Catholic Archdiocese of Los Angeles
Our Lady of the Angels Pastoral Region
San Gabriel Pastoral Region
San Pedro Pastoral Region
Santa Barbara Pastoral Region
List of schools in the Roman Catholic Archdiocese of Los Angeles

External links
Archdiocese of Los Angeles

Roman Catholic Archdiocese of Los Angeles
San Fernando Valley
Los Angeles San Fernando